Uropeltis macrolepis, commonly known as the Bombay earth snake, the Bombay shieldtail, and the large-scaled shieldtail, is a species of snake in the family Uropeltidae. The species is endemic to southern India. There are two recognized subspecies.

Geographic range
Uropeltis macrolepis is found in Maharashtra (Phansad – near Supegaon, Mahabaleshwar, Koyna, Lonavla), India.

Type locality of Silybura macrolepis = "Ceylon?"

Type locality of Uropeltis macrolepis mableshwarensis = "Mahableshwar, Satara district, Bombay State", India.

Habitat

Description
Uropeltis macrolepis is black or dark purplish brown both dorsally and ventrally, with each scale lighter-edged. There is a yellow stripe on the lips and sides of the neck, followed by two to five large yellow spots, and a yellow stripe along each side of the tail.

The smooth dorsal scales are in only 15 rows at midbody (in 17 rows behind the head). The ventrals number 128–140, and the subcaudals number 7–9.

The snout is rounded. The rostral is less than ¼ of the length of the shielded part of the head, the portion visible from above shorter than its distance from the frontal. The nasals are in contact with each other behind the rostral. The frontal is as long as or slightly longer than broad. The diameter of eye is more than ½ the length of the ocular shield. The diameter of body goes 24 to 29 times into the total length. The ventrals are twice as large as the contiguous scales. The end of the tail is obliquely truncate, flat dorsally, with strongly bicarinate scales. The terminal scale has a transverse ridge and two points.

Behavior
Uropeltis macrolepis is terrestrial and fossorial.

Diet
Uropeltis macrolepis preys upon earthworms.

Reproduction
Uropeltis macrolepis is ovoviviparous.

Subspecies
Two subspecies are recognized as being valid, including the nominate race.

Uropeltis macrolepis macrolepis 
Uropeltis macrolepis mahableshwarensis

References

Further reading

Beddome, R.H. (1886). "An Account of the Earth-Snakes of the Peninsula of India and Ceylon". Annals and Magazine of Natural History, Fifth Series 17: 3–33.
Boulenger, G.A. (1890). The Fauna of British India, Including Ceylon and Burma. Reptilia and Batrachia. London: Secretary of State for India in Council. (Taylor and Francis, printers). xviii + 541 pp. (Silybura macrolepis, p. 269).
Chari, V.K. (1952). "Localization of the striped variety of the rough-tailed earthsnake – Uropeltis macrolepis (PETERS) – to Mahableshwar". Journal of the Bombay Natural History Society 50: 950–951.
Chari, V.K. (1953). "Some more notes on Uropeltis macrolepis (PETERS) with special reference to specimens from Mahableshwar (Western Ghats, Bombay)". J. Bombay Nat. Hist. Soc. 51 (2): 512.
Chari, V.K. (1954). "An addition to the list of snakes of Bombay and Salsette – Uropeltis macrolepis (PETERS) – Uropeltidae". J. Bombay Nat. Hist. Soc. 52 (1): 213- 214.
Chari, V.K. (1955). "A new form of the burrowing snake, Uropeltis macrolepis (PETERS) from Mahableshwar". J. Bombay Nat. Hist. Soc. 52 (4): 901. (Uropeltis macrolepis mahableshwarensis, new subspecies).
Das, I. (2002). A Photographic Guide to Snakes and other Reptiles of India. Sanibel Island Florida: Ralph Curtis Books. 144 pp. . (Uropeltis macrolepis, p. 60).
Günther, A.C.L.G. (1864). The Reptiles of British India. London: The Ray Society. (Taylor and Francis, printers). xxvii + 452 pp. + Plates I–XXVI. (Silybura macrolepis, p. 189 + Plate XVII, figure B).
Peters, W.H.C. (1862). "Über eine neue Art der Schlangengattung Silybura, S. macrolepis". Monatsberichte der Königlichen Preussischen Akademie der Wissenschaften zu Berlin 1862: 901–905. (Silybura macrolepis, new species). (in German).
Sekar, A.G.; Almeida, M.R. (1994). "Range extension of the Bombay shield-tail snake Uropelitis macrolepis (Peters 1861) (Serpentes: Uropeltidae)". J. Bombay Nat. Hist. Soc. 90 (3): 520-521 [1993].
Sharma, R.C. (2003). Handbook: Indian Snakes. Kolkata: Zoological Survey of India. 292 pp. .
Smith, M.A. (1943). The Fauna of British India, Ceylon and Burma, Including the Whole of the Indo-Chinese Sub-region. Reptilia and Amphibia. Vol, III,—Serpentes. London: Secretary of State for India. (Taylor and Francis, printers). xii + 583 pp. (Uropeltis macrolepis, new combination, pp. 79–80).
Whitaker, R.; Captain A. (2008). Snakes of India: The Field Guide. Chennai (formerly Madras), India: Draco Books. 495 pp. .

External links
 U. macrolepis image 1/5 at Uetz Lab. Accessed 13 December 2007.
  U. macrolepis image 2/5 at Uetz Lab. Accessed 13 December 2007.
  U. macrolepis image 3/5 at Uetz Lab. Accessed 13 December 2007.
  U. macrolepis image 4/5 at Uetz Lab. Accessed 13 December 2007.
  U. macrolepis image 5/5 at Uetz Lab. Accessed 13 December 2007.

Uropeltidae
Reptiles of India
Endemic fauna of the Western Ghats
Reptiles described in 1862
Taxa named by Wilhelm Peters